Albert Pinhasov (born 9 February 1972) is the Rector of Ariel University. He is a researcher in the fields of Molecular Psychiatry and Psychopharmacology. Prior to being elected as the Rector, he served as the Vice President and Dean for Research & Development and the Head of the Department of Molecular Biology at Ariel University.

Biography
Albert Pinhasov was born on 9 February 1972 in the city of Namangan, Uzbekistan. From 1990 to 1994, he studied at the Gorky Academy of Medicine, in the city of Nizhny Novgorod, Russia.

In 1994, he immigrated to Israel where he continued his education at Tel Aviv University. He was awarded a Master of Science degree (MSc) in 1998 and a PhD in the field of Molecular Biology and Clinical Biochemistry under the mentorship of Illana Gozes in 2002 from Tel Aviv University.

From 2002 to 2004, Pinhasov carried out postdoctoral research at Johnson & Johnson Pharmaceutical Research and Development (Spring House, Pennsylvania, United States), where under the guidance of Dr. Douglas Brenneman he was engaged in the development of drugs for the treatment of neurodegenerative diseases.

In 2005, Pinhasov joined the Department of Molecular Biology at Ariel University (formerly the College of Judea and Samaria) as an assistant professor. He was Head of the department from 2008 to 2014.

In 2014, Pinhasov was appointed the Vice-President and Dean of Research & Development at Ariel University, holding this position until 2020. In 2020 the Senate of Ariel University elected Professor Pinhasov as the Rector of Ariel University, succeeding Professor Michael Zinigrad, who held this office for 12 years.

Research activity
Pinhasov is a researcher at the Department of Molecular Biology and Dr. Miriam and Sheldon G. Adelson School of Medicine.

His research focuses on the understanding of the molecular mechanisms of mental disorders and the relationship between the development of psychiatric deviations and stress sensitivity.

His laboratory group has developed a selectively bred mouse model with strong features of dominance and submissiveness. These mice respectively exhibit manic-like and depression-like behavior with different responses to psychotropic agents and environmental stimuli, demonstrating differential sensitivity to stress. His group showed that inherited susceptibility to stress is linked to gradual development of chronic inflammation, wide-spectrum metabolic alterations, brain neurotransmission deterioration, electrical activity accompanied behavioral disturbances in emotional and cognitive domains, and reduced life expectancy. The Dominant-Submissive mouse model has been shown to be a successful and unique tool for studying the mechanisms of aging related cognitive impairments, mental disorders, and their effects on the entire organism.

Publications
Pinhasov has over 65 peer-reviewed scientific articles, including the following notable publications:

	O Agranyoni, S Meninger-Mordechay, A Uzan, O Ziv, M Salmon-Divon, D Rodin, O Raz, I Koman, O Koren, A Pinhasov, S Navon-Venezia. "Gut microbiota determines the social behavior of mice and induces metabolic and inflammatory changes in their adipose tissue". npj Biofilms and Microbiomes. 1–14, 2021,  
 T Kardash, D Rodin, M Kirby, N Davis, I Koman, J Gorelick, I Michaelevski, A Pinhasov, "Link between personality and response to THC exposure", Behavioural Brain Research 379, 112361, 2020, .
 A Kreinin, S Lisson, E Nesher, J Schneider, J Bergman, K Farhat, J Farah, F Lejbkowicz, G Yadid, L Raskin, I Koman, A Pinhasov, "Blood BDNF level is gender specific in severe depression". PLoS One 10 (5), e0127643, 2015, 
 M Gross, A Pinhasov, "Chronic mild stress in submissive mice: Marked polydipsia and social avoidance without hedonic deficit in the sucrose preference test". Behavioural brain research 298, 25–34, 2016, 
 Y Feder, E Nesher, A Ogran, A Kreinin, E Malatynska, G Yadid, A Pinhasov, "Selective breeding for dominant and submissive behavior in Sabra mice". Journal of Affective Disorders 126 (1-2), 214–222, 2010, 
 Sivan Gershanov, Helen Toledano, Nomi Pernicone, Suzana Fichman, Shalom Michowiz, Albert Pinhasov, et al., "Differences in RNA and microRNA Expression Between PTCH1- and SUFU-mutated Medulloblastoma", Cancer Genomics & Proteomics Vol. 18, Issue 3 May–June 2021, pp. 335–347

References

External links
 
 Prof. Albert Pinhasov – Rector of Ariel University, website of Ariel University
 Albert Pinhasov, website of Ariel University
 Laboratory of Behavioral and Molecular Psychiatry (BMP Laboratory), website of Ariel University
 Albert Pinhasov, Annual meeting of the Emirates Society for Rheumatology
 

Presidents of universities in Israel
Israeli biologists
Psychopharmacologists
Academic staff of Ariel University
Tel Aviv University alumni
Uzbekistani emigrants to Israel
People from Namangan Region
1972 births
Living people